Kaū is the southernmost and largest district (922 sq. miles or 2,388 km2) of Hawaii County, Hawaii, located on the island of Hawaii.

Kaū was one of the six original districts of ancient Hawaii on the island, known as moku.
It includes the areas of South Point (Ka Lae), Hawaiian Ocean View Estates (HOVE), Hawaiian Ocean View Ranchos (HOVR), now together known as Ocean View, Nīnole, Waiōhinu, Naālehu and Pāhala.

The district contains much of Hawaii Volcanoes National Park, including the volcanoes Kīlauea and Mauna Loa, and Punaluu Black Sand Beach, Papakōlea (Green Sand) Beach and Kamilo Beach. 
To the east of Kaū is the Puna District, and to the west is the South Kona District.

History

Sugar cane era begins
The largest commerce in Ka'u was sugar and leading the industry during its prime was Hawaiian Agriculture Co and Hutchinson Sugar Plantation Co.

Hawaiian Agriculture Co was established in 1876 but did not start producing sugar cane until 1880. Locally, it was known as the Pahala Plantation but legally the corporation was filed as the Hawaiian Agricultural Co.  The company employed many workers including immigrants from Philippines, Japan, Portugal, and others.  Corporate housing projects were built to provide living quarters for staff and added to the community of Pahala.  The founders were Peter C. Jones, Charles R. Bishop, J.D. Brewer, and H.A.P. Carter.

The Hutchinson Sugar Plantation Co was established in 1868 by Alexander Hutchinson and it was one of the oldest sugar companies on the Big Island. Shortly, the plantation was renamed Naalehu Sugar Plantation. In his honor, following Hutchinson's death in 1873, William G. Irwin and Claus Spreckels purchased the plantation and renamed it Hutchinson Sugar Plantation. The company purchased Hilea Sugar Plantation in 1890. In 1910, it was purchased by C. Brewer & Co.  Just like its competitor, Hawaiian Agriculture Co, the company employed many locals including immigrants from Philippines, Japan, Portugal, and others.  Corporate housing projects were built to provide living quarters for staff and added to the community of Na'alehu.

Sugar cane era concludes
In 1972, Hawaiian Agricultural Co. merged with Hutchinson Sugar Plantation Co. The merged companies were renamed Kau Sugar Co and was now the only sugar plantation in Ka'u.  However, this unified industry was short lived. After twenty four years,  the sugar cane era finally came to an end with the Ka'u Sugar Co closing operation in 1996.

The coffee industry has been low profile since the early 1900s.  However, after the closure of the Ka'u Sugar co, interest in growing coffee has surged.  Many of Ka'u Sugar co staff were given the option to acquire a land lease in five acre increments to engage in agriculture commerce.  From the lease lots along with private owned lots, coffee were being grown.  The most popular varietals that are grown in the area is Typica and Caturra.

Over the years, the coffee industry has been growing in importance, with the Kaū Coffee Festival held in Pāhala.

Southernmost point

The southernmost point of any state in the United States is at Ka Lae Point in the Kaū District.  It is almost the southernmost point in the whole country except that, technically, the United States Territory of Palmyra Island, although not part of a state within the US, is an incorporated territory (an integral part of the country) according to the doctrine of "incorporation" defined in the Supreme Court's Insular Cases; therefore Palmyra's south point on Holei Island at 5°52'15" N latitude is officially the southernmost point in the United States of America, not Ka Lae Point.

Lender and insurance redlining of lava zone 1 and 2
Kau shares much in common with the district of Puna, Hawaii.  Both districts are situated on active volcanoes and contains large sections of land that are in Lava Flow Hazard Zones 1 and 2. Additionally, new lava zones 11, 12, and 13 are being established to account for current flow activity to reduce redlining.

Gallery

References

Districts of Hawaii County, Hawaii
Geography of Hawaii (island)